Peymot (also Romanized as Peymoţ; also known as Peymod and Peymowd) is a village in Mian Band Rural District, in the Central District of Nur County, Mazandaran Province, Iran. At the 2006 census, its population was 84, in 27 families.

References 

Populated places in Nur County